Marion Helen Schilling (December 3, 1910 – November 6, 2004) was an American stage and film actress. She was one of the most famous "B" leading ladies of the 1930s.

Biography
Marion Helen Schilling was born in Denver, Colorado in 1910.

Her family moved to St. Louis when she was young. She graduated from Central High School there in 1928. She started her acting career as a stage actress, starring in stage plays such as Miss Lulu Betts and Mrs. Wiggs of the Cabbage Patch. While playing in Dracula on stage with Bela Lugosi, she developed a blood-curdling scream so effective, when she was working in Hollywood, she was asked to dub screams for Constance Bennett and Shilling's idol Pola Negri. In 1929 she received her first screen role in Wise Girls. Shilling had good memories of her director E. Mason Hopper when interviewed in the 90's. "I can still remember some of his early suggestions. 'Keep your head above the tide.' 'Be on your toes.' 'Hold your head high.' 'Act like the queen of the studio.' Those were wonderful words to a new, green girl numbed by all that was suddenly happening to her." After a couple of roles in other films, she starred opposite William Powell in the 1930 crime drama Shadow of the Law. That movie springboarded her into roles as a B-movie heroine.

In 1931 she was one of thirteen girls selected as "WAMPAS Baby Stars", a list that included future Hollywood star Marian Marsh. From 1930 to 1936 she starred in forty two films, mostly westerns or mysteries. She often starred opposite Tom Keene and Guinn "Big Boy" Williams. In the 1934 film serial, The Red Rider, she starred opposite early western film legend Buck Jones, with a supporting cast that included William Desmond and football legend Jim Thorpe.

Recognition
In 2002, Shilling received a Golden Boot Award for her contribution to Western films.

Personal life
Shilling retired in 1936, to marry and have a family. She was married to Edward Cook from 1937 until his death in 1998. They had two children, Edward and Frances.

Death
She never returned to acting, and died from natural causes on November 6, 2004, in a hospital in Torrance, California, aged 93.

Filmography

Feature films

Short films

References

External links

 
 
 
 Marion Shilling, B-movie heroine

Actresses from Denver
American film actresses
American stage actresses
1910 births
2004 deaths
20th-century American actresses
WAMPAS Baby Stars
21st-century American women